Daniel C. Martin was a state legislator in Florida. He represented Alachua County in the Florida State Senate in 1885 and 1887. He lived in the 13th District in Gainesville. A photo of him with other legislators is held in the Florida Archives. He was one of the last African Americans to serve in the state senate.

See also
List of African-American officeholders during the Reconstruction era

References

African-American politicians during the Reconstruction Era
Year of birth missing (living people)
19th-century American politicians
African-American state legislators in Florida
People from Gainesville, Florida